Tangab-e Shush (also Romanized as Tangāb-e Shūsh; also known as Tangāb and Tangolāb) is a village in Babuyi Rural District, Basht District, Basht County, Kohgiluyeh and Boyer-Ahmad Province, Iran. At the 2006 census, its population was 57, in 12 families.

References 

Populated places in Basht County